Thomas Edward Sieckmann (born January 14, 1955) is an American professional golfer who has played on the PGA Tour. 

Sieckmann was born in York, Nebraska. He won several amateur tournaments in his home state while growing up, and received the 1974 Nebraska Golf Association's Amateur of the Year award. Sieckmann attended Oklahoma State University, and was a member of the golf team. He turned professional in 1977.

Sieckmann had a 17-year career on the PGA Tour highlighted by a win at the 1988 Anheuser-Busch Golf Classic. He had a top 10 finish at the 1990 U.S. Open. He spent a significant amount of time playing overseas during his regular career years and won several tournaments. In his late forties, Sieckmann played some on the Nationwide Tour. His career earnings total in excess of $1.3 million.

In 1994 Sieckmann along with two other partners, developed Shadow Ridge Country Club. One year later he retired from the tour devoting all of his time to be the President of the General Partner. In 1999 Sieckmann sold his interest in Shadow Ridge and went to work for Dave Pelz Golf. He was Director of Instruction for Dave Pelz Golf for 10 years and has since worked primarily as a teaching professional. In 1988 Sieckmann founded Creative Golf, Inc. a company that primarily developed and organized the Mutual of Omaha Pro-Am. In 2005, he opened Sieckmann Golf Labs, a golf performance and teaching center in southwest Omaha, but sold his teaching business to Omaha Country Club. He is currently Director of Golf instruction and training at Omaha Country Club.

In 2015, Sieckmann and two other partners purchased Palmbrook Country Club in Sun City, Arizona.

Amateur wins
1970 Nebraska Junior Amateur Championship
1974 Nebraska Amateur Championship, Nebraska Match-Play Championship
1976 Nebraska Amateur Championship

Professional wins (8)

PGA Tour wins (1)

PGA Tour playoff record (1–0)

Asia Golf Circuit wins (3)
1981 Thailand Open, Philippine Open
1984 Singapore Open

Other wins (4)
1980 Waterloo Open Golf Classic
1981 Brazil Open
1982 Rolex Open (Switzerland)
1992 Mexican Open

Results in major championships

Note: Sieckmann never played in The Open Championship.

CUT = missed the half-way cut
"T" = tied

See also
1984 PGA Tour Qualifying School graduates
1985 PGA Tour Qualifying School graduates
1987 PGA Tour Qualifying School graduates

References

External links

American male golfers
Oklahoma State Cowboys golfers
PGA Tour golfers
Golf course architects
Golfers from Nebraska
People from York, Nebraska
Sportspeople from Omaha, Nebraska
1955 births
Living people